Felicia Edem Attipoe is a Ghanaian female aircraft marshaller, the first woman in Ghana to hold this male-dominated position. She is also known to have produced Key Soap Concert Party, an old popular comedy show.

Education 
Attipoe received her secondary education at the OLA Senior High School in Ho, Volta Region. She continued her education at the African University College of Communications, where she earned a bachelor's degree in Arts. She holds a degree in Photography from Temple University, Japan. She also holds certificates in Aerodrome Safety, Marshalling, and Radio Telephony from the Aviation School.

Career 
Her journey to becoming an aircraft marshaller began in 1999, when she was hired to work as a secretary at the Ghana Civil Aviation. After Ghana Civil Aviation got decoupled, she joined the Ghana Airports Company Limited and worked as a secretary for ten years. In 2011, she was transferred to the Ramp Manager's office as a secretary. Upon realizing there was very little she could do as a secretary, and upon developing an interest while watching men marshall the aircraft to the bay, she sought to work in that field from the director of the airport operations. When the opportunity for training of marshallers showed up, she applied and eventually was hired into the position.

Awards 
2019—She won the Most Inspiring Woman in Aviation Industry, at the Maiden Ghana Most Inspiring Women's Award.

Personal life 
She has two children.

References

Living people
Year of birth missing (living people)
OLA Girls Senior High School (Ho) alumni
Temple University alumni